Enfleurage is a process that uses odorless fats that are solid at room temperature to capture the fragrant compounds exuded by plants. The process can be "cold" enfleurage or "hot" enfleurage.

Process 
There are two types of processes:
In cold enfleurage, a large framed plate of glass, called a chassis, is smeared with a layer of animal fat, usually lard or tallow (from pork or beef, respectively), and allowed to set. Botanical matter, usually petals or whole flowers, is then placed on the fat and its scent is allowed to diffuse into the fat over the course of 1–3 days. The process is then repeated by replacing the spent botanicals with fresh ones until the fat has reached a desired degree of fragrance saturation. This procedure was developed in southern France in the 18th century for the production of high-grade concentrates.
In hot enfleurage, solid fats are heated and botanical matter is stirred into the fat. Spent botanicals are repeatedly strained from the fat and replaced with fresh material until the fat is saturated with fragrance. This method is considered the oldest known procedure for preserving plant fragrance substances.

In both instances, once the fat is saturated with fragrance, it is then called the "enfleurage pomade".  The enfleurage pomade was either sold as it was, or it could be further washed or soaked in ethyl alcohol to draw the fragrant molecules into the alcohol.  The alcohol was then separated from the fat and allowed to evaporate, leaving behind the absolute of the botanical matter. The spent fat is usually used to make soaps since it is still relatively fragrant.

Other fragrance extraction methods 

The enfleurage fragrance extraction method is one of the oldest. It is also highly inefficient and costly but was the sole method of extracting the fragrant compounds in delicate flowers such as jasmine and tuberose, which would be destroyed or denatured by the high temperatures required by methods of fragrance extraction such as steam distillation. The method is now superseded by more efficient techniques such as solvent extraction or supercritical fluid extraction using supercritical carbon dioxide (CO2) or similar compressed gases.

References

External links

Perfumery
Flavor technology